Diospage is a genus of moths in the family Erebidae first described by Francis Walker in 1854.

Species
Diospage carilla Schaus, 1910
Diospage chrysobasis Hampson, 1901
Diospage cleasa (Druce, 1883)
Diospage engelkei Rothschild, 1909
Diospage rhebus (Cramer, 1779)
Diospage semimarginata Rothschild, 1909
Diospage splendens (Druce, 1895)
Diospage steinbachi Rothschild, 1909
Diospage violitincta Rothschild, 1909

References

External links

Euchromiina
Moth genera